Anne McCall is an academic administrator and literary scholar. She is the former senior vice president for academic affairs and provost at Xavier University of Louisiana. She was also an associate dean at Tulane University. McCall's research focuses on nineteenth-century French literature, with a specialization in the works of author George Sand. McCall has been chosen to serve as the 13th president of the College of Wooster, starting in July 2023.

Early life and education 
Anne McCall was born in Washington, D.C.

McCall received her BA in French and German from the University of Virginia.  She earned her PhD in literature from the University of Strasbourg.

Selected publications 
 Anne E. McCall. "The Bibliothèque Nationale and Cultural Productions of Scholarship." South Central Review. 29:3. Special Issue: Cultural Production in Nineteenth Century France: A Tribute to Lawrence R. Schehr (Fall 2012): 47–62. 
 Anne E. McCall. "Still Life and Fetal Exploits in Flora Tristan’s Pérégrinations d’une paria." The Romantic Review 98 (2007): 83–101. 
 Anne E. McCall. "George Sand and the Genealogy of Terror."  L'Esprit Créateur 35:4 (Winter 1995): 38–48.

References 

Year of birth missing (living people)
Women heads of universities and colleges
University of Virginia alumni
Academics from Washington, D.C.
University of Strasbourg alumni
Living people

College of Wooster faculty